Finocchio is a station of Line C of the Rome Metro. It is located at the intersection of Via di Rocca Cencia with Via Mandanici and Piazza Serrule, in the Roman frazione of Borgata Finocchio.

After a thorough rebuilt, the stop re-opened on 9 November 2014 as part of the new Metro line.

External links

Rome Metro Line C stations
Railway stations opened in 2014
2014 establishments in Italy
Railway stations in Italy opened in the 21st century